The term Mosquito Fleet has had a variety of naval and commercial uses around the world.

United States
In U.S. naval and maritime history, the term has had ten main meanings:
The United States Navy's fleet of small gunboats, leading up to and during the War of 1812, most were part of the New Orleans Squadron.
A squadron of shallow-draft schooners sent to the West Indies under the command of Commodore David Porter to suppress piracy between 1823 and 1825, founding the West Indies Squadron.
The name of a United States Navy "squadron detachment", commanded by Commodore Matthew C. Perry, that fought against the Mexican fortresses at Tuxpan and Villahermosa during the Mexican–American War.
In the American Civil War, it was the name of a group of converted gunboats originally of the North Carolina Navy, later transferred to the Confederate States Navy, that operated in and near the North Carolina Sounds from the start of the war until the Battle of Elizabeth City.
In the American Civil War, it was the name of Commodore George Hollins River defense fleet that opposed the Union Gulf Blockade fleet in the Battle of the Head of Passes.
A fleet of small steam vessels which plied the waters of Puget Sound during the late 19th century and early 20th century (see Washington State Ferries and Puget Sound Navigation Company). It was also used to describe the various steamboats and other small craft that served on the rivers and bays of the Oregon coast. (See Steamboats of the Oregon Coast).  There was also a similar fleet on the east coast of the United States; see Sabino.
A fleet of converted yachts used by the US Navy during World War I off the Atlantic Coast of France to patrol for U-boats and provide support for convoys into Brest, France.  This fleet was also called the "Suicide Fleet".
The fast, wooden PT boat used by the American navy in World War II, with the most famous being PT-109, skippered by Lieutenant Junior Grade John F. Kennedy, a future president of the United States.
The fleet of sailing ships that plied the waters off the coast of South Carolina and Georgia in the mid-19th century, trawling for shrimp and selling their catch in local markets; the fleet was primarily crewed by Gullah fishermen.
Named for the shrimp boats' insect-like profiles, Galveston's Mosquito Fleet continues to dock at Pier 19 (commons:File:Mosquito Fleet Berth, Pier 19 Galveston.jpg) enriching the city and nation and blending Asian and European fisher customs into Americanisms

South Australia

The term "Mosquito Fleet" also refers to the fleet of small ketches and schooners operating in the shallow coastal and gulf waters of South Australia, from 1836 to 1982.

Queensland

In the early days of settlement at Geraldton (now Innisfail), the Johnstone River had a sand bar at the mouth and several shallow stretches in the river. The problem of large ships being unable to enter the river made it difficult for bags of sugar from the district sugar mills to be transported to southern refineries. To overcome this problem, shallow draft steam ships and lighters were used to carry the bags of sugar out to meet larger ships. The small ships became known as "The Mosquito Fleet".

References

Military units and formations of the United States Navy